Richard Eugene Starr (March 2, 1921 – January 18, 2017) was a Major League Baseball pitcher. He was born in Kittanning, Pennsylvania.

New York Yankees
Starr signed with the New York Yankees in 1941, and went a combined 32–12 with a 4.00 earned run average for the Butler Yankees over two seasons. He missed the 1943 through 1945 seasons serving in the US Army in World War II. When he returned to the Yankees in 1946, he went 19–10 with a 2.07 ERA for the Augusta Tigers.

Assigned to the Newark Bears in 1947 and 1948, he was called up to the Yankees when rosters expanded in September of both seasons following the conclusion of the minor league season. His first major league start was a complete game victory over Fred Sanford and the St. Louis Browns. At the 1948 winter meetings, he was traded to the Browns with Red Embree and Sherm Lollar plus $100,000 for Sanford and Roy Partee.

Starr went 1–7 with a 4.32 ERA for a Browns team that lost 101 games in 1949, however; he was 7–5 with a 5.02 ERA in 1950, and was the only pitcher on the Browns' pitching staff with a winning record. He was involved in a second trade for Sanford during the 1951 season, this time, going to the Washington Senators even up for Sanford.

Minor leagues
Starr returned to the minor leagues in 1952, going 21–21 with a 3.88 ERA over two seasons with the International League's Baltimore Orioles. He joined the unaffiliated Richmond Virginians in 1954, and returned to the Yankees organization when the team became affiliated with the Yankees in 1956. Starr also pitched in the Venezuelan Winter League with the Caracas Lions (1952–53) and Magellan's Navigators (1953–54) and in the 1953 Caribbean Series.

Major leagues
Over five major league seasons, Starr posted a 12–24 record with 120 strikeouts and a 5.25 ERA in 93 appearances, including 45 starts, seven complete games, two shutouts, two saves, and 344⅔ innings of work.

Personal
After his playing career ended, Starr was employed in the production control department for the Allegheny Ludlum Steel Corporation.

Starr died on January 18, 2017, in Kittanning, Pennsylvania at the Armstrong County Health Center where he and his wife resided, the same town in which he was born.

References

External links
, or Baseball Library, or Retrosheet 
SABR Biography Project
Venezuelan Professional Baseball League statistics

1921 births
2017 deaths
Augusta Tigers players
Baltimore Orioles (IL) players
Baseball players from Pennsylvania
Butler Yankees players
Findlay Browns players
Leones del Caracas players
Major League Baseball pitchers
Navegantes del Magallanes players
American expatriate baseball players in Venezuela
New York Yankees players
Newark Bears players
Richmond Virginians (minor league) players
St. Louis Browns players
Washington Senators (1901–1960) players
United States Army personnel of World War II